The politics of Toronto, Toronto, Ontario, Canada involve the election of representatives to the federal, provincial, and municipal levels of government. A total of 25 Members of Parliament (MPs) representing Toronto sit in the House of Commons of Canada in Ottawa (the federal capital), and another 25 Members of Ontario's Provincial Parliament (MPPs) sit in the Legislative Assembly of Ontario at Queen's Park, in Toronto. Being Ontario's capital, many provincial offices are located in the city.

Overview
In terms of electoral politics, Toronto had been an important source of support for the federal Liberal Party of Canada and the provincial Ontario Liberal Party although the downtown area tends to support the New Democratic Party (NDP). The federal Conservative Party and the provincial Progressive Conservative Party have historically been weaker in the city, but some right-leaning Liberals come from Toronto ridings.

In the past, the Liberals usually dominated the inner portions of the city federally, and the outer portions were split between the Liberals and Progressive Conservatives. However, the Liberals swept every seat in Toronto from 1993 to 2004, when former city councillor and NDP leader Jack Layton won a downtown riding. The NDP won two more seats in 2006 but lost one in 2008. In the 2011 federal election, Toronto sent nine Conservative MPs to Ottawa, eight NDP MPs, and six Liberal MPs, the first time that a centre-right party had won seats in Toronto since 1988. However, in 2015, the Liberals swept every seat in Toronto.

Large parts of Toronto, mainly its outer portions, supported the right-wing government of Mike Harris during the 1995 and 1999 Ontario elections. However, largely as a result of amalgamating Metro Toronto municipalities against the wishes of three quarters of voters in a municipal plebiscite, as well as of the downloading of responsibility for costly services onto the city, the Conservatives were shut of Toronto in provincial elections from 2003 to 2013, when they won a byelection.

The businessman and politician Mel Lastman was the first mayor of the newly-amalgamated City of Toronto and the 62nd mayor of Toronto after he won the 1997 and was re-elected in 2000.  The centre-leftist David Miller was elected as Toronto's 63rd mayor in December 2003 and was re-elected in November 2006 with nearly 60% of the popular vote with a mandate to make Toronto a city of prosperity, livability, and opportunity for all. Miller declined to run in the following election and a conservative ally, Rob Ford, won the 2010 election handily. Three years later, however, Ford's tumultuous reign and admission to smoking crack, as well as other indiscretions that attracted unwanted international media attention, led City Council to remove many of his powers and much of his office's budget. In the following election, Ford was forced to drop out because of treatment for pleomorphic liposarcoma, a rare form of cancer. The mayoral election was won by John Tory, a lawyer and a former a talk show host, businessman, Member of Provincial Parliament, and Leader of the Official Opposition at Queen's Park. Among Tory's top priorities are tackling transit and traffic congestion.

The Stronger City of Toronto for a Stronger Ontario Act, 2006 (Bill 53) was enacted by the Legislative Assembly of Ontario on June 12, 2006. The provincial law changed the city's legal powers and responsibilities.

Members of Parliament
Toronto is represented by 25 MPs.

Members by riding

Members of Provincial Parliament
Toronto is represented by 25 MPPs.

Members by riding

See also
 Bill 103
 Metro Toronto

References